Queen of the Night (German: Königin einer Nacht) is a 1931 French musical comedy film directed by Fritz Wendhausen and starring Friedl Haerlin, Karl Ludwig Diehl and Walter Janssen. It is an operetta film. It is the German-language version of the French film La Femme d'une nuit. A separate Italian version was also made. Multiple-language versions were a common feature of the early years of sound before dubbing became firmly established.

The film's sets were designed by the art director Pierre Schild.

Cast
 Friedl Haerlin as Königin Eleana  
 Karl Ludwig Diehl as Adjudant  
 Walter Janssen as Paul d'Armont  
 Peggy Norman as Prinzessin Natascha 
 Adele Sandrock as Gräfin Markowicz  
 Otto Wallburg as Gaston Molneau  
 Paul Morgan as Der Gesandte  
 Albert Paulig as Geschäftsführer  
 Julius Falkenstein 
 Harry Bender 
 Ludwig Stössel 
 Gustl Gstettenbaur
 Friedrich Ettel 
 Marion Gerth 
 Marianne Kupfer 
 Lotte Stein 
 Toni Tetzlaff 
 Hans Wassmann

References

Bibliography 
 Grange, William. Cultural Chronicle of the Weimar Republic. Scarecrow Press, 2008.

External links 
 

1931 films
1931 musical comedy films
1930s German-language films
Films directed by Fritz Wendhausen
Operetta films
French multilingual films
French black-and-white films
French musical comedy films
1931 multilingual films
1930s French films